The Etude was an American print magazine dedicated to music founded by Theodore Presser (1848–1925) at Lynchburg, Virginia, and first published in October 1883. Presser, who had also founded the Music Teachers National Association, moved his publishing headquarters to Philadelphia, Pennsylvania in 1884, and his Theodore Presser Company continued the magazine until 1957.

Aimed at all musicians, from the novice through the serious student to the professional, The Etude printed articles about both basic (or "popular") and more-involved musical subjects (including history, literature, gossip, and politics), contained write-in advice columns about musical pedagogy, and piano sheet music, of all performer ability levels, totaling over 10,000 works. Helen Tretbar edited the magazine in the late 1880s. James Francis Cooke, editor-in-chief from 1909 to 1949, added the phrase "Music Exalts Life!" to the magazine's masthead, and The Etude became a platform for Cooke's somewhat polemical and militantly optimistic editorials. The sometimes conservative outlook and contents of the magazine may have contributed to a decline in circulation in the 1930s and '40s, but in many respects it moved with the times, unequivocally supporting the phonograph, radio, and eventually television, and, by the late 1930s, fully embracing jazz. By the end, George Rochberg was an editor of The Etude under Guy McCoy, who had succeeded Cooke as editor-in-chief after over two decades as an assistant, and the magazine's musical content had come more closely in-step with the contemporary world.

References

Further reading
 Bomberger, D.E. An index to music published in The Etude magazine, 1883–1957. (Lanham, Md.: Scarecrow Press, 2004).

External links
 The Etude Magazine: 1883-1957 (Digital Commons @ Gardner-Webb University), offers an interface for searching the contents and makes it possible to download colour scans of entire searchable issues
 A tribute site to The Etude, including scans of certain issues and articles, with commentary
 Music Magazines in the early 20th century, ParlorSongs.com

Defunct magazines published in the United States
Magazines established in 1883
Magazines disestablished in 1957
Magazines published in Virginia
Magazines published in Philadelphia
Music magazines published in the United States